Marla Lorraine Dowell (born 1965) is an American physicist who is Director of the NIST Communications Technology Laboratory and NIST Boulder Laboratory.

Early life and education 
Dowell became interested in science and mathematics as a child. Her father is an engineer and her step-father was a physicist. Dowell was an undergraduate in physics at the University of Michigan. She was encouraged by her physics professors to pursue a career in research. She moved to the Massachusetts Institute of Technology for doctoral research, where she worked under the supervision of June Lorraine Matthews. Her doctoral research considered pion single charge exchange. After earning her doctorate, Dowell joined JILA, where she worked as a postdoctoral research associate in atomic physics. Dowell has been a long-time advocate for K-12 STEM education. She earned a Master of Business Administration at the University of Colorado Boulder.

Research and career 
At National Institute of Standards and Technology, Dowell was responsible for the NIST laser metrology program. At the start, the group focused on calibration, but under her leadership, Dowell developed a research program in laser metrology for industrial applications.  Connecting fundamental research to industry needs has been a unifying theme of Dowell's career – from optical metrology for semiconductor manufacturing to solving today’s challenges with 5G deployment with new electromagnetic metrology.  She has leveraged partnerships with other federal agencies to expand NIST research activities in wireless communication networks. 

Dowell has written about job hunting strategies for navigating transitions between different STEM disciplines.

Dowell was made Director of the Communications Technology Laboratory and the NIST Boulder Laboratory Director in 2017.  The National Academies have cited the strength and breadth of the NIST Communication Technology Laboratory programs under Dowell's leadership.  In 2023, Dowell was elected a Fellow of SPIE.

Awards and honors 
 2000 Judson C. French Award
 2005 Department of Commerce Silver Medal
 2005 NIST Equal Employment Opportunity/Diversity Award
 2010 Arthur S. Flemming Award
 2012 Allen V. Astin Award
 2016 SPIE Women in Optics

References 

Living people
1965 births
20th-century American scientists
21st-century American scientists
American women physicists
University of Michigan alumni
University of Colorado Boulder alumni
Massachusetts Institute of Technology alumni
Massachusetts Institute of Technology School of Science alumni
MIT Department of Physics alumni
National Institute of Standards and Technology people
20th-century American women scientists
21st-century American women scientists